Esther María Koplowitz y Romero de Juseu, 7th Marchioness of Casa Peñalver, LH is a Spanish businesswoman and philanthropist.

Biography 
Koplowitz is vice-president of the Board of Fomento de Construcciones y Contratas (FCC), one of the leading diversified Spanish groups, employing around ninety thousand people. She also holds board positions in several national and international companies, for instance vice-president of the board of Cementos Portland Valderrivas, and was formerly board member of French multinational Veolia Environnement.

She is chairwoman of the Foundation that bears her name, the Esther Koplowitz Foundation, principally dedicated to charity work to help those most in need in society. She has built, equipped and donated care homes such as “Nuestra Casa” in Collado-Villalba (Madrid), and “La Nostra Casa” of Fort-Pienc in Barcelona, both for the elderly in need of special assistance as well as those without financial means, and “La Nostra Casa de Vall de la Ballestera” in Valencia for physically and mentally disabled adults. The construction of two other care homes is in the pipeline, one in Valladolid and a second in Valencia. They will both share the same objective as the home already built in Valencia.

She has received numerous recognitions and awards for her philanthropic work as well as for her business acumen. Among them the Great Cross of the Order of Civil Merit, Gold Medal of Civil Order for Charitable Acts, Madrid Region Gold Medal, Blanquerna award from Catalonia Regional Government and gold medal, Academic Honour from the Royal Academy of History and Chevalier de l'ordre de la Légion d'honneur.

WikiLeaks reveals that Esther Koplowitz made donations to the conservative organisation Hazte Oír, which itself funds the Vox party.

Titles 
Esther and Alicia inherited their noble titles from their mother. Esther was the Marchioness of Casa Peñalver and Marchioness of Campo Florido, titles now owned by her two daughters Carmen Alcocer y Koplowitz (now Marchioness of Casa Peñalver) and Alicia Alcocer y Koplowitz (now Marchioness of Campo Florido). Her sister Alicia is the Marquesa de Bellavista.

In 2003 Esther Koplowitz married Fernando Falcó, 3rd Marquess of Cubas, whom she divorced in 2009.

References

External links 
 El Mundo
 Libertad digital

1953 births
Living people
20th-century Spanish businesswomen
20th-century Spanish businesspeople
21st-century Spanish businesswomen
21st-century Spanish businesspeople
Businesspeople in construction
Chairpersons of non-governmental organizations
Chairwomen
Chevaliers of the Légion d'honneur
Female billionaires
Marquesses of Cubas
Recipients of the Civil Order of Alfonso X, the Wise
Spanish billionaires
Spanish people of Cuban descent
Spanish people of German-Jewish descent
Spanish philanthropists
Veolia